Nice Women is a 1931 American pre-Code romance film written and directed by Edwin H. Knopf. The film stars Sidney Fox, Frances Dee, Alan Mowbray, Lucile Gleason, Russell Gleason and James Durkin. It was released by Universal Pictures on November 28, 1931.

The film is based on the Broadway play Nice Women by William A. Grew, which premiered at the Longacre Theatre on June 10, 1929 and closed in August 1929 after 64 performances.

Plot
A young woman, Jerry Girard (Frances Dee) is pushed by her mother (Lucille Gleason) and family into accepting the marriage proposal of a millionaire, Mark Chandler (Alan Mowbray), who is the employer of her father (James Durkin).  To do so, she has to drop the boy she really loves and promised to marry, Billy Wells (Russell Gleason), but her family is seeking to recover from their financial woes and find security.  When the millionaire finds out the real situation, he releases her from her vow and gives the young couple a $5000 wedding gift. He then leaves for Europe with an old flame, Dorothy Drew (Carmel Myers).

Cast 
Sidney Fox as Beth Girard
Frances Dee as Jerry Girard
Alan Mowbray as Mark Chandler
Lucile Gleason as Mrs. Girard 
Russell Gleason as Bill Wells
James Durkin as Mr. Girard
Kenneth Seiling as Jackie Girard
Carmel Myers as Dorothy Drew
Leonard Carey as Connors
Jo Wallace as Miss Irvine
Patsy O'Byrne as Mary
Florence Enright as Maid

Reception
The review in The New York Times called the film a "puerile story of a frustrated romance" and a "sorry affair" caused by "too many studio cooks", and points out "the plain fact of its mediocrity..." The reviewer also reports that the audience seemed indifferent to the film.

References

External links 
 
 
 

1931 films
American romance films
1930s romance films
Universal Pictures films
Films directed by Edwin H. Knopf
American black-and-white films
1930s English-language films
1930s American films